Natalya Nikolaevna Khorokhorina  (Kharakhorina ; born in 1954) is a Soviet and Russian film and stage actress.

Biography 

Natalya Nikolaevna Khorokhorina was born May 5, 1954 at the farm near the village of Moscow Vnukovo in Moscow region in a working-class family.

As a schoolgirl, Natasha attended drama school at the Pioneers Palace.

After high school, Natalya spent a year on self-education and additional documents filed immediately and Boris Shchukin Theatre Institute, and Mikhail Shchepkin Higher Theatre School. She was accepted into both. She chose the Shchepkin School, and graduated in 1976, course of Viktor Korshunov.

After graduation from the school, Natalia worked in the theaters Moscow Chamber Troupe, The Ark, Sphere.

Natalia Khorokhorina also played at the Moscow Mayakovsky Theatre. In the Moscow theater Sphere, Horohorina served eleven years. Her acting debut in cinema was in the drama of Georgiy Kalatozishvili Cafe Isotope in 1976.

During her career she played mostly supporting roles and has about 90 credits in cinema. Popularity to the actress came after playing in the movie Pirates of the 20th Century (1980).

Notable films with her participation include Mustached Nanny (1977), White Dew (1983), Unknown Soldier (1984), Entrance to the Labyrinth (1989), Zone of Lyube (1994), Demobbed (2000), The Spanish Voyage of Stepanich (2006) and television series The Voronin family (2009-2014).

In 2004 she received the title of Honoured Artist of Russia.

Personal life
Natalia first married when she was a student, but soon divorced.

Her second husband was Vladimir Sobolev, she married him in the beginning of the 1990s. In 1992, their daughter Anya was born. They divorced in the early 2000s.

Selected filmography
1976 —  Traitor   as teacher-educator
1977 —  Mustached Nanny as Mom
 1979 —  Father and Son as Anna
 1979 —  Pirates of the 20th Century as Masha
 1981 — Express on Fire as Vera
 1982 — Fairy tales... fairy tales... fairy tales of the old Arbat as episode
 1983 —  White Dew as  Vera  
 1987 —  Dark Eyes as the lady from the suite
 1989 — Entrance to the Labyrinth as Ekaterina Pachkalina
 1996  — Love in Russian 2 as governor's secretary  
 2000 —  Demobbed as  mother
 2000 —  The Envy of Gods as administrator of movie theatre
 2010 — Our Russia. The Balls of Fate as Larisa's mother
 2013/14 —  Daddy's Daughters as manager

References

External links
 
 Official website

1954 births
Living people
Actresses from Moscow
Soviet film actresses
Russian film actresses
Soviet stage actresses
Russian stage actresses
Soviet television actresses
Russian television actresses
20th-century Russian actresses
21st-century Russian actresses
Honored Artists of the Russian Federation